The 2019 Schwaben Open was a professional tennis tournament played on clay courts. It was the 1st edition of the tournament which was part of the 2019 ATP Challenger Tour. It took place in Augsburg, Germany between 5 and 11 August 2019.

Singles main-draw entrants

Seeds

 1 Rankings are as of July 29, 2019.

Other entrants
The following players received wildcards into the singles main draw:
  Daniel Altmaier
  Jeremy Jahn
  Kai Lemstra
  Robert Strombachs
  Louis Wessels

The following player received entry into the singles main draw using a protected ranking:
  Aleksandre Metreveli

The following players received entry into the singles main draw using their ITF World Tennis Ranking:
  Javier Barranco Cosano
  Eduard Esteve Lobato
  Peter Heller
  Arthur Rinderknech
  Jeroen Vanneste

The following players received entry from the qualifying draw:
  Sriram Balaji
  Geoffrey Blancaneaux

The following players received entry as lucky losers:
  Niklas Guttau
  Vijay Sundar Prashanth

Champions

Singles

  Yannick Hanfmann def.  Emil Ruusuvuori 2–6, 6–4, 7–5.

Doubles

  Andrei Vasilevski /  Igor Zelenay def.  Ivan Sabanov /  Matej Sabanov 4–6, 6–4, [10–3].

References

2019 ATP Challenger Tour
2019 in German tennis
August 2019 sports events in Germany
Tennis tournaments in Germany